Harutyunagomer or Gyzylgaya is a village that is, de facto, in the Martakert Province of the breakaway Republic of Artsakh; de jure, it is in the Kalbajar District of Azerbaijan, in the disputed region of Nagorno-Karabakh. The village has an ethnic Armenian-majority population, and also had an Armenian majority in 1989.

History 
During the Soviet period, the village was part of the Mardakert District of the Nagorno-Karabakh Autonomous Oblast.

Historical heritage sites 
Historical heritage sites in and around the village include tombs from the 2nd–1st millennia BCE, a medieval village, as well as an 18th/19th-century church and cemetery.

Economy and culture 
The village has a municipal building, a medical centre, five shops, and a secondary school.

Demographics 
The village had 400 inhabitants in 2005, and 517 inhabitants in 2015.

References

External links 
 

Populated places in Martakert Province
Populated places in Kalbajar District